Alfred Thomas "A.T." Frank (born October 5, 1966) is an American politician and judge from Michigan currently serving as a judge of the 70th District Court in Saginaw County. He previously served as a Democratic member of the Michigan House of Representatives, representing parts of Saginaw and Bay counties. Frank is also a former chairman of the State Tax Commission, an agency of state government responsible for the administration of property tax laws and which assists, advises, educates, and certifies assessing officers.

References

Democratic Party members of the Michigan House of Representatives
People from Saginaw County, Michigan
Western Michigan University alumni
Western Michigan University Cooley Law School alumni
1966 births
Living people
20th-century American politicians
21st-century American politicians
21st-century American judges